3+2 may refer to:

Three Plus Two, a 1963 film
3+2 (band), a Belarusian band